Unión Sporting Club was a Spanish football team based in Vigo, in the autonomous community of Galicia. Founded in 1922, the club was dissolved in 1939.

History
Unión SC was founded in 1922, from a merge of Comercial Football Club and Victoria Sport Club. In the 1933–34 season, the club won the Tercera División, and disputed one campaign in Segunda División, finishing last in its group.

In 1937, Unión SC was disbanded, mainly due to the Spanish Civil War. The club did not return to an active status, but the club's board and players joined Football Club Vigués in 1939, acting mainly as Celta de Vigo's reserve team.

Seasons

 1 season in Segunda División
 2 seasons in Tercera División

External links
La Futbolteca history 

Defunct football clubs in Galicia
Association football clubs established in 1922
Association football clubs disestablished in 1937
Football clubs in Galicia (Spain)
1922 establishments in Spain
1937 disestablishments in Spain
Segunda División clubs